Haim Corfu (‎; 6 January 1921 – 23 February 2015) was an Israeli politician, and earlier Irgun member and assassin.

Biography
Corfu was born in Jerusalem in 1921. He studied in religious schools and yeshivas and attended a  religious teachers seminary. In 1937 he joined the Irgun and was a member of the Irgun command in Jerusalem. During that time he also played as a striker for Beitar Jerusalem. He used his training as an electrician to design explosives. He was responsible for the assassinations of CID officers Ralph Cairns and Ronald Barker. Corfu, observing the two while hiding behind a stonemason's shack, pressed the detonator of the remotely-controlled mine that killed them. He was in charge of mining the income tax offices on 26 February 1944. He was subsequently interned in Sudan and Kenya by the British, where he also put his skills as an electrician to use in an attempt to escape.

After the establishment of the State of Israel he studied law at the Hebrew University of Jerusalem and was certified as a lawyer. From 1967 to 1969 he was a member of the Jerusalem city council. In 1969, he was elected to the seventh Knesset for Gahal, and was subsequently elected to the eighth through twelfth Knessets for Likud. In the seventh and eighth Knessets he was a member of the finance committee and in the eighth he was also a member of the subcommittee for the defense budget. In the ninth and twelfth Knessets he was a member of the Foreign Affairs and Defense Committee and in the twelfth he was the chairman of the house committee.

Between 1981 and 1988 he served as transportation minister, supporting the consolidation of Israel Railways with the Ports Authority.

In 1986, he was invited to attend a transportation convention in Morocco and thus became the first Israeli cabinet member to be asked to attend a conference in an Arab country other than Egypt. In 1987, he voted for a bill to grant a blanket amnesty  to the Jewish Underground prisoners. In April 1992 he resigned from the Knesset to become chairman of the Israeli Airports Authority, a position he held until 1996.

References

External links

1921 births
2015 deaths
Place of death missing
20th-century Israeli lawyers
Association football forwards
Beitar Jerusalem F.C. players
Gahal politicians
Hebrew University of Jerusalem Faculty of Law alumni
Irgun members
Israeli electricians
Israeli footballers
Israeli Jews
Jewish Israeli politicians
Likud politicians
Members of the 7th Knesset (1969–1974)
Members of the 8th Knesset (1974–1977)
Members of the 9th Knesset (1977–1981)
Members of the 10th Knesset (1981–1984)
Members of the 11th Knesset (1984–1988)
Members of the 12th Knesset (1988–1992)
Ministers of Transport of Israel
Politicians from Jerusalem
Lawyers from Jerusalem